Expiation is a 1922 British silent crime film directed by Sinclair Hill and starring Ivy Close, Fred Raynham and Lionelle Howard. It was based on an 1887 novel by E. Phillips Oppenheim. The film was made by Stoll Pictures at the Cricklewood Studios.

Cast
 Ivy Close as Eva Mornington  
 Fred Raynham as Cecil Braithwaite  
 Lionelle Howard as Godfrey Mornington  
 Malcolm Tod as Lord Dereham 
 Daisy Campbell as Mrs. Langton  
 Fred Rains as Mr. Woodruffe

References

Bibliography
 Low, Rachael. History of the British Film, 1918-1929. George Allen & Unwin, 1971.

External links

1922 films
1922 crime films
British silent feature films
British crime films
Films directed by Sinclair Hill
Films based on British novels
Stoll Pictures films
Films shot at Cricklewood Studios
Films set in England
British black-and-white films
1920s English-language films
1920s British films